Pity for the Vamps (French: Pitié pour les vamps) is a 1956 French drama film directed by Jean Josipovici and starring Viviane Romance, Geneviève Kervine and Yves Vincent.

Cast
 Viviane Romance as Flora Davis 
 Geneviève Kervine as Anne Davis 
Josette Arno  as Nicole 
 Yves Vincent as André Larcher 
 Gabrielle Dorziat a sÉléonore Davis 
 Jane Marken as Mme Edith 
 Jean Meyer as Pierre 
 Roland Bailly as Julien 
 Félix Marten as Paul Duke 
 Marcel Charvey as Marcel-Marcel 
 France Roche as Laure Fontaine 
 Jacqueline Noëlle as Yvette 
 Eliane Saint-Jean
 Aram Stephan as Le producteur 
 Jacques Bézard
 Jean-Daniel Ehrmann
 Jannick Arvel
 Monique Vivin
 Gisèle Pascal as Jany Cristal-Davis 
 Gina Manès as L'actrice âgée 
 Max Montavon as Le modiste 
 Bernard Musson as L'extra au banquet

References

Bibliography 
 Philippe Rège. Encyclopedia of French Film Directors, Volume 1. Scarecrow Press, 2009.

External links 
 

1956 films
French drama films
1956 drama films
1950s French-language films
Films directed by Jean Josipovici
1950s French films